Elections to the second Rajasthan Legislative Assembly were held in 1957.

State Reorganization
On 1 November 1956, under States Reorganisation Act, 1956, the Ajmer State, the Abu Road taluka of the Banaskantha district of Bombay State, the Sunel enclave of the Mandsaur district and the Lohara sub-tehsil of the Hissar district of the Punjab was merged with Rajasthan while the Sironj sub-division of the Kota district of Rajasthan was transferred to Madhya Pradesh. This resulted in the change in assembly constituencies from 140 with 160 seats to 136 with 176 seats in 1957 assembly elections.

Constituencies
Due to States Reorganisation Act 1956, Rajasthan assembly constituencies changed from 140 with 160 seats to 136 with 176 seats. 96 of them were single member constituencies while the number of double member constituencies was 40. 28 of the double member constituencies were reserved for Scheduled Caste while 4 of the single member and 12 of the double member constituencies (total 16 constituencies) were reserved for Schedule Tribe. There were 48,43,841 electors in single member constituencies, while 38,92,288 were in double member constituencies. Total 737 candidates contested for the 176 seats of the 136 constituencies in the Assembly. Poll percentage in the 1957 election was 38.45%.

Political Parties
Four national parties, Communist Party of India, Indian National Congress, Praja Socialist Party and Bharatiya Jana Sangha along with the state party Akhil Bharatiya Ram Rajya Parishad took part in the assembly election. Congress was the clear winner in the elections winning 67.61% of the total seats (i.~e. 119/176 seats) with a vote share of 45.13%. Mohan Lal Sukhadia from the Congress party became the Chief Minister again.

Results

!colspan=10|
|- style="background-color:#E9E9E9; text-align:center;"
! colspan=2| Party !! Flag !! Seats  Contested !! Won !! Net Change  in seats !! % of  Seats
! Votes !! Vote % !! Change in vote %
|- style="background: #90EE90;"
| 
| 
| 176 || 119 ||  37 || 67.61 || 21,41,931 || 45.13 ||  5.67
|-
| 
|
| 60 || 17 ||  7 || 9.66 || 4,69,540 || 9.89 ||  2.37
|-
| 
|
| 51 || 6 ||  2 || 3.41 || 2,63,443 || 5.55 ||  0.38
|-
| 
|
| 27 || 1 || New || 0.57 || 1,17,532 || 2.48 || New
|-
| 
| 
| 24 || 1 ||  1 || 0.57 || 1,43,547 || 3.02 ||  2.49
|-
| 
|
| 399 || 32 ||  3 || 18.18 || 16,10,465 || 33.93 || N/A
|- class="unsortable" style="background-color:#E9E9E9"
! colspan = 3|
! style="text-align:center;" |Total Seats !! 176 ( 16) !! style="text-align:center;" |Voters !! 1,24,37,064 !! style="text-align:center;" |Turnout !! colspan = 2|47,46,458 (38.16%)
|}

Elected members

See also

 1957 elections in India
 1952 Rajasthan Legislative Assembly election

References

Rajasthan
1957
1957